Farm to Market Road 305 (FM 305) is a Farm to Market Road in the U.S. state of Texas maintained by the Texas Department of Transportation (TxDOT). The road, located in Pecos, Crockett, and Upton counties, begins at U.S. Route 190 (US 190) near Iraan linking the town to McCamey where the road ends at  US 67 / US 385. FM 305 has one major intersection between its endpoints with  FM 1901.

Route description
The  two-lane road begins along US 190 in eastern Pecos County between Bakersfield and Iraan. The road proceeds to the northwest to the Pecos River where the road crosses into Crockett County. FM 305 continues to the northwest through the northwestern corner of Crockett County and enters Upton County shortly before reaching McCamey. In McCamey, the road is known as South Burleson Avenue. The road intersects FM 1901 approaching from the south on the southern edge of town. In the center of town, the road crosses the South Orient Rail Line just before terminating at US 67 and US 385.

History

The road proceeded along the current US 190 to FM 305's current southern terminus, and then along the current route to the Pecos River. A mere 17 days later, the designation was extended across the river into Crockett County to the county line at Upton County. The road was extended on August 25, 1949 to its current terminus at US 67 in McCamey.

FM 1257 was designated on May 23, 1951 from the present-day intersection of FM 305 and US 190 eastward along the current US 190 toward Iraan. US 385 was routed in 1959 through McCamey at the northern terminus of FM 305. US 190 was extended westward from Brady replacing FM 1257 and the portion of FM 305 west of the current southern terminus on June 30, 1977.

Major intersections

See also

References

External links

0305
Transportation in Crockett County, Texas
Transportation in Pecos County, Texas
Transportation in Upton County, Texas